Go West may refer to:

"Go West, young man", a quote often attributed to American author Horace Greeley concerning America's expansion westward
A euphemism for death

Companies
Go West, a division of NZ Bus that operates bus services between Auckland's West and central suburbs

Film, art and entertainment
Go West (1925 film), a 1925 film by Buster Keaton
Go West (1940 film), a 1940 Marx Brothers comedy film
Go West (2005 film), a 2005 Bosnian film directed by Ahmed Imamović
Go West (exhibition), the Stuckist art show in Spectrum London gallery, 2006
Go West, a manga by Yu Yagami

Music
Go West (band), a British pop band successful through the 1980s and 1990s
Go West (Go West album), the band's first album in 1985
Go West (Village People album), a 1979 album by the Village People

Songs
"Go West" (song), a 1979 song by the Village People, later covered by the Pet Shop Boys in 1993
"Go West", a song by Liz Phair on the 1994 album Whip-Smart
"Go West", a song by Chris Spedding on the 1986 album Enemy Within
"Go West (Crazy Spinning Circles)", a song by The Cult on the 1984 album Dreamtime

See also
China Western Development, economic policy
Gone West (horse)
Go west, young man (disambiguation)